Bogert House may refer to:

Bogert House (Bogota, New Jersey), listed on the National Register of Historic Places (NRHP)
Bogert House (Demarest, New Jersey), NRHP-listed
Isaac Bogert House, Mahwah, New Jersey, NRHP-listed in Bergen County
John Jacob Bogert House, Harrington Park, New Jersey, NRHP-listed